Stratus is a Serbian heavy metal band.

Band history
The band was formed in 2002 by guitarists Darko Konstantinoviċ and Saša Jankoviċ. A former Osvajači vocalist Nenad Jovanović joined the band in 2003. With Goran Pešić (bass guitar), Goran Nikolić (drums) and Aleksandar Ljubisavljević (keyboard), they released their self-titled debut album Stratus in March 2005.

In 2008, Nenad Vukeliċ (bass guitar), Sale Stojković (drums) and Slaviša Malenoviċ (keyboards) became the band's new members. In 2008, the band released their second studio album Equilibrium.

Discography

Studio albums
Stratus (2005)
Equilibrium? (2008)

External links 
Stratus official website
Stratus on MySpace
Stratus on Facebook

Serbian hard rock musical groups
Serbian heavy metal musical groups
Serbian progressive metal musical groups
Musical groups established in 2002
2002 establishments in Serbia